Bismillah Khan (born 9 August 1948) is a Pakistani politician who had been a member of the National Assembly of Pakistan from June 2013 to May 2018.

Early life

He was born on 9 August 1948 to khan Masoom jan khan  .

Political career

He was elected to the National Assembly of Pakistan as an independent candidate from Constituency NA-43 (Tribal Area-VIII) in 2013 Pakistani general election. He received 13,929 votes and defeated Zaffar Khan, a candidate of Pakistan Tehreek-e-Insaf.

References

Living people
Pashtun people
Pakistani MNAs 2013–2018
People from Khyber Pakhtunkhwa
1948 births